The 1962 UCI Road World Championships took place from 31 August-2 September 1962 in Salò, Italy. The team time trial made its debut.

Results

Medal table

External links 

 Men's results
 Women's results
  Results at sportpro.it

 
UCI Road World Championships by year
UCI Road World Championships 1962
UCI Road World Championships 1962
Uci Road World Championships, 1962
1962 in road cycling
September 1962 sports events in Europe